Leonard Rader (March 29, 1921 – December 29, 1996) was an American professional basketball player. He played for the Tri-Cities Blackhawks and Hammond Calumet Buccaneers in the National Basketball League and averaged 3.6 points per game.

His twin brother is Howie Rader, who also played professional basketball.

References

1921 births
1996 deaths
20th-century American Jews
American Basketball League (1925–1955) players
American men's basketball players
Basketball players from New York City
Forwards (basketball)
Guards (basketball)
Hammond Calumet Buccaneers players
Jewish men's basketball players
LIU Brooklyn Blackbirds men's basketball players
Philadelphia Sphas players
Player-coaches
Professional Basketball League of America players
Sportspeople from Brooklyn
Tri-Cities Blackhawks players